Hockey Rage 2005 is a hockey game for the Nokia N-Gage and Gizmondo handheld game console. The game features Bluetooth two player option.

2005 video games
Gizmondo games
Multiplayer and single-player video games